Juan Pablo Faúndez (born 2 November 1975) is a Chilean sprinter. He competed in the men's 4 × 100 metres relay at the 2000 Summer Olympics.

References

1975 births
Living people
Athletes (track and field) at the 2000 Summer Olympics
Chilean male sprinters
Olympic athletes of Chile
Place of birth missing (living people)
South American Games bronze medalists for Chile
South American Games medalists in athletics
Competitors at the 1998 South American Games
20th-century Chilean people